The 2021–22 Ohio State Buckeyes men's ice hockey season was the 59th season of play for the program. They represented the Ohio State University in the 2021–22 NCAA Division I men's ice hockey season. This season marked the ninth season in the Big Ten Conference. They were coached by Steve Rohlik, in his ninth season, and played their home games at Value City Arena.

Season
Entering the season, Ohio State was picked to finish last in the Big Ten. The Buckeyes, however, began the season well, winning three of their first four games. While the victories helped, the first few weeks also settled the goaltending competition when freshman Jakub Dobeš established himself as the starter over Ryan Snowden. Ohio State was able to use stellar performances from the Czech goalie to dramatically exceed expectations for the year.

After beginning their conference schedule, OSU swept Penn State and then earned splits with Michigan, Minnesota and Notre Dame, all ranked teams. While their record wasn't particularly outstanding by the end of December, Ohio State had played well enough to rise up to 17th in the ranking, putting them in a prime position to make the NCAA Tournament. In the first half of the year, Ohio State's offense was clicking along at more than three goals per game and was performing very consistently, being held under 3 goals on just five occasions.

The Buckeyes played even better after the Winter Break, losing just once in twelve games. While their opponents weren't particularly strong, OSU was able to get up to 8th in the polls and, more importantly, they were in the top 10 of the PairWise rankings. All the Buckeyes needed to guarantee themselves a spot in the tournament was a win or two in the final few weeks of the season but, just as they were ready to make postseason plans, the wheels came off.

Ohio State's final two opponents were top two teams in the conference, Minnesota and Michigan. Both were playing at a very high level while the Buckeyes were seemingly coasting into the conference tournament. The OSU offense, a strength all season, failed. The team scored just 6 goals in 4 games. Worse, Dobeš didn't play particularly well as the team allowed 8 goals against in both weekends and were swept by both teams. The four consecutive losses could not have come at a worse time, dropping Ohio State down the rankings, but the team's postseason hopes were still alive due to the strength of their conquerors.

Ohio State sat 13th in the PairWise as they began the Big Ten Tournament. While the top 10 were automatically qualified for the NCAA tournament, the next 6 could receive bids based on postseason results. As long as Ohio State got out of the conference quarterfinals, they would likely receive an at-large bid. Their opponent, Penn State, had had a dreadful conference season; despite being just one place behind the Buckeyes, PSU was 22 points lower in the standings. The first game went to script for OSU as the offense seemed to get back on track but it was the defense that looked to be a problem. While they won 4–3, Ohio State allowed 52 shots against and that trend continued over the next two games. Penn State carried the bulk of the play, outshooting the Buckeyes by at least 10 in each of the three games. While Ohio State was able to score in the first match, they faltered in games 2 and 3, allowing the Nittany Lions to win both and potting themselves on the postseason bubble.

After losing the series, Ohio State was dropped down to 15 in the PairWise. Because none of the Atlantic Hockey teams were in the top 16, that was the lowest possible position that could make the tournament. Ohio State could only wait and hope that there were no upsets for any of the five other conference championships. The next week the team got a slight boost when both the Big Ten and NCHC all advanced teams that were guaranteed bids to their respective championships but they had to hold their breath as spoilers from the CCHA, ECAC and Hockey East continued. On the final day of conference play, Ohio State needed each of those three championship games to go a specific way but they could only get two. When Harvard won the ECAC championship, Ohio State was knocked out and their season was over.

Departures

Recruiting

Roster
As of August 23, 2021.

Standings

Schedule and results

|-
!colspan=12 style=";" | Exhibition

|-
!colspan=12 style=";" | Regular Season

|-
!colspan=12 style=";" |

Scoring statistics

Goaltending statistics

Rankings

Note: USCHO did not release a poll in week 24.

Awards and honors

Players drafted into the NHL

2022 NHL Entry Draft

† incoming freshman

References

External links

2021–22
Ohio State Buckeyes
Ohio State Buckeyes
Ohio State Buckeyes
Ohio State Buckeyes